Ronald James McAulay (born 1935/1936) is a Hong Kong billionaire businessman.

Education 
McAulay has a master's degree from the University of Glasgow.

Career
McAulay qualified as an accountant, and is a member of the Institute of Chartered Accountants of Scotland.

McAulay has large holdings in, and has sat on the boards of Hongkong and Shanghai Hotels since 1972, and CLP Group since 1968. As of November 2015, Forbes estimated his net worth at US$2.6 billion.

Personal life
McAulay is married to Rita Laura McAulay, the sister of fellow Hong Kong billionaire Sir Michael Kadoorie, and they live in Hong Kong. They have a son, Andrew James Kadoorie McAulay, who is chairman of Kadoorie Farm and Botanic Garden.

McAulay is a member of the International Council of the Tate Gallery and a trustee of the Victoria and Albert Museum, both in London.

References

1936 births
Living people
Hong Kong billionaires
Hong Kong businesspeople
Alumni of the University of Glasgow